Hendrik Bogaert (born 30 August 1968) is a Belgian politician from Flanders and member of the Christian Democratic and Flemish party (CD&V). Since 2003, he is member of the Belgian Chamber of Representatives.
He studied Master in Economics at KULeuven.
He has been mayor of Jabbeke.

On 6 December 2011, he became Secretary of State for Civil Service and Modernisation of Public Services in the Di Rupo I Government.

References 

1968 births
Living people
Politicians from Bruges
21st-century Belgian politicians
Flemish politicians